Vitaly Orlov (born 5 October 1987) is a Ukrainian rugby union player. He plays as number eight and as a flanker.

Orlov played for Aviator Kiev, in Ukraine, moving afterwards to the professional Russian team of Yenisey-STM Krasnoyarsk, in 2009/10, where he currently plays.

He has also been selected for Ukraine. He participated in the 2011 Rugby World Cup qualifyings, where Ukraine was eliminated after two losses to Romania. He was a member of the winning team of the 2008–2010 European Nations Cup Second Division, which earned Ukraine promotion for the First Division.

External links
Vitaly Orlov at the Enisey-STM Krasnoyarsk Official Site

1987 births
Living people
Ukrainian rugby union players
Rugby union number eights
Rugby union flankers
Ukrainian expatriate rugby union players
Expatriate rugby union players in Russia
Ukrainian expatriate sportspeople in Russia